Bromethenmadinone acetate (BMMA, also known as bromsuperlutin) is a progestin medication which was developed in Czechoslovakia and was described in 1970 but was never marketed. Analogues of BMMA include chlormethenmadinone acetate, melengestrol acetate, and methenmadinone acetate.

See also
 List of progestogen esters § Esters of 17α-hydroxyprogesterone derivatives
 16-Methylene-17α-hydroxyprogesterone acetate

References

Abandoned drugs
Acetate esters
Bromoarenes
Enones
Diketones
Pregnanes
Progestogen esters
Progestogens
Veterinary drugs
Vinylidene compounds